Queering the Script is a Canadian documentary film, directed by Gabrielle Zilkha and released in 2019. Beginning at ClexaCon, a fan convention for lesbian, bisexual, queer and transgender women, the film explores the issue of LGBTQ representation in media, including the ways in which social media activism has influenced the telling of queer women's stories in entertainment by organizing campaigns against storytelling tropes such as queerbaiting and Dead Lesbian Syndrome.

The film premiered on May 26, 2019 at the Inside Out Film and Video Festival in Toronto. It was subsequently screened at Outfest in Los Angeles, where it won a Special Programming Award for Freedom.

References

External links
 

2019 films
2019 LGBT-related films
Canadian documentary films
Canadian LGBT-related films
Documentary films about lesbians
Documentary films about LGBT film
2019 documentary films
2010s English-language films
2010s Canadian films